Pine Ridge is an unincorporated community and census-designated place (CDP) in Darlington County, South Carolina, United States. It was first listed as a CDP prior to the 2020 census with a population of 807.

The CDP is in northwestern Darlington County, along South Carolina Highway 151, which leads southeast  to Hartsville and northwest  to McBee. A portion of the eastern border of the CDP follows Black Creek, a southeast-flowing tributary of the Great Pee Dee River, and the south border of the CDP follows Beaverdam Creek, an east-flowing tributary of Black Creek. The H. B. Robinson Nuclear Generating Station is just outside the northeast border of the CDP, adjacent to Lake Robinson, a reservoir built on Black Creek.

Demographics

2020 census

Note: the US Census treats Hispanic/Latino as an ethnic category. This table excludes Latinos from the racial categories and assigns them to a separate category. Hispanics/Latinos can be of any race.

References 

Census-designated places in Darlington County, South Carolina
Census-designated places in South Carolina